Phobos is an audio drama based on the long-running British science fiction television series Doctor Who. This audio drama was produced by Big Finish Productions and was broadcast on BBC 7 on 28 January 2007.

Plot
The Doctor and Lucie land on Phobos, the moon of Mars, which has become popular with extreme sports fans in the future, due to a wormhole on the surface which is used for bungee jumping. The Doctor and Lucie listen to Kai Tobias's stories of monsters on the surface, although no-one takes him seriously. Later the monsters from Tobias's stories appear and begin attacking visitors. When The Doctor discovers that the monsters are just robots, Tobias reveals that an entity from another universe is in the wormhole and that it feeds on the pleasurable fear extreme sports fans feel. However, it is hurt by real fear and Tobias made the robots to create real fear. The Doctor enters the wormhole and shows the entity his fears, which kill it, and The Doctor and Lucie leave. The Headhunter awakens on the moon's medical ward, angry that she has missed Lucie again.

Cast
The Doctor — Paul McGann
Lucie Miller — Sheridan Smith
Amy/Headhunter — Katarina Olsson
Kai Tobias — Timothy West
Eris — Nerys Hughes
Drew — Ben Silverstone
Hayd — John Schwab
Farl — Tim Sutton
Lad – Jake McGann

Continuity
The 2000 Big Finish audio play The Fearmonger also features a creature which stirs up fear and feeds on it.
The short story Crimson Dawn in the book Decalog 2: Lost Properties explains that Phobos is an artificial moon created by Ice Warriors.
The 2006 Big Finish audio play Memory Lane  features a character called Kim Kronotska who says she was on a Phobos mission.
The Fifth Doctor comic strip story The Moderator features a reference to Phobos at the start of part 2.
The Eighth Doctor visits Mars' other moon in Deimos.
The Doctor, when showing the entity his own fears, mentions his fears of the future, and the fears of things that he sees he himself might have to do. This is possibly a reference to the events of the Time War, which was to occur in the Eighth Doctor's relative distant future, in which the Doctor was forced to kill all of his own people, the Time Lords.

References

External links
Phobos

2007 audio plays
Eighth Doctor audio plays
Radio plays based on Doctor Who
2007 radio dramas
Fiction set on Phobos (moon)